Rukwanzi may refer to:
 Potamonautes rukwanzi, a crustacean native to Uganda
 Rukwanzi Island, an island in Lake Albert